Tommy Allen may refer to:

Tommy Allen (footballer, born 1897) (1897–1968), English footballer
Tommy Allen (Australian footballer) (1914–1965), Australian rules footballer
Tommy Allen (speedway rider) (born 1984), British speedway rider
Tommy Allen (field hockey) (born 1946), Irish hockey player

See also
Thomas Allen (disambiguation)
Allen (surname)